Federation of Indian Animal Protection Organisations (FIAPO) is a collective of animal protection organisations in India to help, represent, connect up, and inform, animal protection organisations and activists across India. It also undertakes campaigns on which there is not significant work already going on in India and research on rights of animals. FIAPO was registered on 25 November 2010 under the Indian Trusts Act, 1882.

Values
It promotes Five Basic Freedoms specifically for animals and generally for all living beings. FIAPO promotes peace as an alternative solution to the notion held by any culture, custom or religion that animals are property of humanity which can be used by humanity as commodities, labourers or as natural, harvest-able resources.

Freedom from Hunger and Thirst: by Providing access to fresh water and a diet to maintain full health and vigour.
Freedom from Discomfort: by providing an appropriate shelter and resting area. 
Freedom from Pain, Injury or Disease: by prevention or rapid diagnosis and treatment. 
Freedom to Express Normal Behaviour: by providing sufficient space, proper facilities and company of the animal's own kind. 
Freedom from Fear and Distress: by ensuring conditions and treatment which avoid mental suffering.

Wildlife Protection Amendment bill
In 2022, a Wildlife Protection Amendment Bill was introduced in parliament on the last session of the Winter session which was held on 23 December 2021 to legalise trade in elephants.
A petition was filed by FIAPO calling for the dilution of Section 43 of the Wildlife Protection Amendment Act.

See also 
 Animal welfare and rights in India
 Awarded by Bhagwan Mahaveer Award in Non Violence & Vegetarianism in 2021.

References

2010 establishments in Delhi
Animal welfare organisations based in India
Organizations established in 2010